Christiane P. Koch is a German physicist whose research involves quantum mechanical versions of control theory, including the use of lasers to achieve coherent control of chemical reactions. She has also performed research on efficiently testing the accuracy of quantum computing devices. She is a professor at the Free University of Berlin.

Education and career
Koch studied physics at the Humboldt University of Berlin from 1992 to 1998, during which she was a Fulbright Scholar at the University of Texas at Austin. She did her doctoral studies in chemical physics through Humbold University at the Fritz Haber Institute of the Max Planck Society, completing her Ph.D. in 2002.

After postdoctoral study at the University of Paris-Sud and The Hebrew University of Jerusalem, she became an Emmy Noether Independent Junior Researcher at the Free University of Berlin in 2006. She became a professor at Kassel in 2010, and moved to the Free University of Berlin in 2019.

Recognition
In 2002, Koch won the Otto Hahn Medal of the Max Planck Society.

References

External links

Year of birth missing (living people)
Living people
Humboldt University of Berlin alumni
Academic staff of the Free University of Berlin
Academic staff of the University of Kassel
21st-century German physicists
German women physicists
Control theorists